99 Bricks Wizard Academy is an iOS and Android game developed by Dutch indie studio WeirdBeard B.V. and released on February 18, 2014.

Critical reception
The game has a Metacritic rating of 86% based on 6 critic reviews.

148apps wrote "This puzzle game combines Tetris with physics, magic, and a healthy dose of charm." Gamer.nl said "99 Bricks: Wizard Academy is sympathetic, addicting and challenging. New challenges introduced at the right times intelligently show how much depth the simple ‘build-a-tower-Tetris-game’ can have." TouchArcade said "I think it's something anyone who likes Tetris can appreciate, and that's just about everyone there is, right?" IGN Italia wrote "A very nice and extremely fun variation on the Tetris model." Pocket Gamer UK said "Don't let its visual similarity to Tetris fool you. This is a game that stands on its own very high merits. " Appspy said "99 Bricks Wizard Academy is a jolly physics construction game that proves while we may have problems, 99 Bricks ain’t one."

Sequel

In 2015, WeirdBeardGames announced a follow-up title, Tricky Towers, releasing in August 2016 for PlayStation 4 and PC.

References

2014 video games
Android (operating system) games
IOS games
Cancelled PlayStation Vita games
Puzzle video games
Video games developed in the Netherlands
Single-player video games